is a song recorded by Japanese singer Misia for her tenth studio album, Soul Quest. It was released as the album's lead single by Ariola Japan on May 25, 2011. "Kioku" is the theme song to the EX drama series Iryū Sōsa, starring Takaya Kamikawa.

Background and release
"Kioku" is Misia's first single in nearly a year and a half, since "Hoshi no Yō ni..." (2009). The single includes a duet between Misia and JP, titled "Kono Mama de Tonight", as well as a cover of the 1967 Frankie Valli song "Can't Take My Eyes Off You". The first pressing of the physical release features a remix of "Maware Maware" as bonus track.

Composition
"Kioku" was co-written by Misia and Gorō Matsui, composed by Korean composer and record producer BZ4U and produced by Shirō Sagisu. The song is composed in the key of B-flat major and set to a common time tempo of 65 beats per minute. Misia's vocals span from F3 to E5 in modal voice, and up to G5 in head voice. TV Asashi producer Yumiko Miwa tasked Misia to write a song that would convey "hope and sympathy". Misia penned the lyrics to "Kioku" shortly following the 2011 Tōhoku earthquake and tsunami, and she describes thinking of recent events while writing the song.

Critical reception
CDJournal critics describe the song as a "majestic and beautiful" piano ballad with an orchestral arrangement. Misia received acclaim for the "presence" of her vocal performance, with critics noting "Kioku" as an example of Misia "showing herself at her best", and for writing lyrics with a strong message.

Music video
The music video for "Kioku" was directed by Electrotnik. It premiered on May 11, 2011 on Space Shower TV. The video features a collection of pictures of "fond memories", some submitted by fans through an online submission campaign set up by Misia's team. A picture of an infant Misia surrounded by her older brother and sister can be seen near the end of the video. A doll made of papier-mâché, animated in stop motion, also appears throughout the video.

Chart performance
"Kioku" entered the daily Oricon Singles Chart at number 14, where it also peaked. The single debuted at number 21 on the weekly Oricon Singles Chart, with 6,000 copies sold. It charted for four weeks and sold a reported total of 8,000 copies during its run.

Track listing

Credits and personnel
Personnel

 Vocals – Misia
 Songwriting – Misia, Gorō Matsui, BZ4U
 Arrangement, production, percussion, conducting – Shirō Sagisu
 Piano – Yasuharu Nakanishi
 Drums – Eiji Shimamura
 Guitar – Takayuki Hijikata
 Bass guitar – Yasuo Tomikura
 Flute – Jonathan Snowden
 French horns – Richard Watkins, Nigel Black
 Orchestra – The London Studio Orchestra
 Soprano – Catherine Bott
 Alto – Deborah Miles-Johnson
 Tenor – Andrew Busher
 Bass – Michael George
 Engineering – Masahiro Kawaguchi, Shirō Sagisu, Philip Bagenal, Rupert Coulson
 Mixing – Eiji Uchinuma
 Mastering – Herb Powers Jr.

Charts

Release history

References

External links
 Kioku on Rhythmedia's official website

2011 singles
2011 songs
Misia songs
Songs written by Misia
Songs with lyrics by Gorō Matsui
Songs written by Shirō Sagisu
Song recordings produced by Shirō Sagisu
Japanese television drama theme songs
Ariola Japan singles